Podium is a genus of thread-waisted wasps in the family Sphecidae. There are at least 20 described species in Podium.

Species
These 23 species belong to the genus Podium:

 Podium agile Kohl, 1902 i c g
 Podium angustifrons Kohl, 1902 i c g
 Podium aureosericeum Kohl, 1902 i c g
 Podium batesianum W. Schulz, 1904 i c g
 Podium bugabense Cameron, 1888 i c g
 Podium chalybaeum Kohl, 1902 i c g
 Podium denticulatum F. Smith, 1856 i c g
 Podium eurycephalum Ohl, 1996 i c g
 Podium foxii Kohl, 1902 i c g
 Podium friesei Kohl, 1902 i c g
 Podium fulvipes Cresson, 1865 i c g
 Podium fumigatum (Perty, 1833) i c g
 Podium intermissum Kohl, 1902 i c g
 Podium iridescens Kohl, 1902 i c g
 Podium kohlii Zavattari, 1908 i c g
 Podium krombeini Bohart and Menke, 1963 i c g
 Podium luctuosum F. Smith, 1856 i c g b
 Podium opalinum F. Smith, 1856 i c g
 Podium plesiosaurus (F. Smith, 1873) i c g
 Podium rufipes Fabricius, 1804 i c g b
 Podium sexdentatum Taschenberg, 1869 i c g
 Podium tau (Dalla Torre, 1897) i c g
 Podium trigonopsoides Menke, 1974 i c g

Data sources: i = ITIS, c = Catalogue of Life, g = GBIF, b = Bugguide.net

References

Sphecidae
Articles created by Qbugbot